Cerro Toco is a stratovolcano located in the eastern part of the Atacama desert in Chile's II Region (Antofagasta), approximately  south of the border between Bolivia and Chile and  SE of the Juriques and Licancabur volcanoes. It conforms the north eastern extreme of the Purico Complex, a pyroclastic shield made up by several stratovolcanoes, lava domes and a maar.

Cerro Toco is located in the Chajnantor Scientific Reserve, as is most of the Purico Complex.

See also
List of volcanoes in Chile
Purico Complex
Licancabur
Juriques
Laguna Verde (Bolivia)

References
 
 (Spanish)

Volcanoes of Antofagasta Region
Stratovolcanoes of Chile
Mountains of Chile